Rommel Mejía (born 4 February 1994) is a Salvadoran professional footballer who plays as a forward.

Honours 
C.D. Dragón
Runner-up
 Primera División: 2014 Clausura

References

External links 
 

1994 births
Living people
Salvadoran footballers
El Salvador international footballers
Association football forwards
C.D. Águila footballers
Central American Games bronze medalists for El Salvador
Central American Games medalists in football